John Somers Gill (19 April 1932 – 3 March 2003) was an Australian rules footballer who played with Essendon in the Victorian Football League (VFL) from 1951 to 1957.

A highly talented ruckman with a strong overhead mark, and a delightfully graceful and accurate "palm", he walked straight into the Essendon senior team at 19 years of age. 

Recruited from the Longerenong Agricultural College, in Horsham, Victoria, he made his debut, two days after his nineteenth birthday, for Essendon's seniors in the first home-and-away match of the 1951 season, on 21 April 1951, when Essendon defeated Melbourne 13.8 (86) to 10.16 (76) at Windy Hill.

He won the Crichton Medal in 1954, and finished third in that season's Brownlow Medal count.

He represented Victoria in 1955 and 1957.

Having missed the 1951 Grand Final due to illness, he played in his first grand final in 1957 but was on the losing side. It turned out to be his last game of football as he retired at the age of just 25 to concentrate on his business career.

Fans were shocked at his decision to retire, because he seemed to be just starting to achieve his outstanding potential, and he seemed destined to become one of the all-time great ruckmen. His retirement created the space for the (then) second-string ruckman Geoff Leek's career to blossom.

References

External links

Footystats Diary — Obituary: John Somers Gill

1932 births
2003 deaths
Australian rules footballers from Victoria (Australia)
Essendon Football Club players
Crichton Medal winners